Ralph Richard Poston (January 2, 1923 – March 20, 2009) was an American politician. He served as a Democratic member of the Florida House of Representatives.  He also served as a member for the 38th and 46th district of the Florida Senate.

Life and career 
Poston attended Andrew Jackson High School and the University of Houston. He served in the United States Navy during World War II.

In 1965, Poston was elected to the Florida House of Representatives, serving until 1966. In the same year, he was elected to represent the 46th district of the Florida Senate, serving until 1972, when he was elected to represent the 38th district, serving until 1978.

Poston died in March 2009, at the age of 86.

References 

1923 births
2009 deaths
Democratic Party members of the Florida House of Representatives
Democratic Party Florida state senators
20th-century American politicians
University of Houston alumni